Following is a list of dams and reservoirs in New Hampshire.

All major dams are linked below.

Dams and reservoirs in New Hampshire

This list is incomplete.  You can help Wikipedia by expanding it.

 Ayers Island Dam, Ayers Island Reservoir, Public Service Company Of New Hampshire
 Bellamy Reservoir Dam, Bellamy Reservoir, City of Portsmouth, New Hampshire
 Blackwater Dam, Blackwater Reservoir, United States Army Corps of Engineers
 Deering Dam, Deering Reservoir, New Hampshire Water Resources Council
 Everett Dam, Hopkinton-Everett Reservoir, USACE
 Frank D. Comerford Dam, Comerford Reservoir, TransCanada Corporation (on Vermont border)
 Franklin Falls Dam, Franklin Falls Reservoir, USACE
 Franklin Pierce Dam, Franklin Pierce Lake, Public Service Company Of New Hampshire
 Hopkinton Dam, Hopkinton-Everett Reservoir, USACE
 Jericho Pond Dam, Jericho Lake, privately owned
 Edward MacDowell Dam, Edward MacDowell Lake, USACE
 McIndoes Dam, McIndoes Reservoir, TransCanada Corporation (on Vermont border)
 Meadow Pond Dam (failed), privately owned
 Moore Dam, Moore Reservoir, TransCanada Corporation (on Vermont border)
 Murphy Dam, Lake Francis, New Hampshire Water Resources Council
 Otter Brook Dam, Otter Brook Reservoir, USACE
 Pontook Dam, Pontook Reservoir, New Hampshire Water Resources Council
 Surry Mountain Dam, Surry Mountain Lake, USACE
 Weare Dam, Weare Reservoir, New Hampshire Water Resources Council
 Wheeler Dam, Arlington Mill Reservoir, Town of Salem, New Hampshire

References 

New Hampshire
Dams
Dams